Ahmadabad-e Atayi (also Romanized as Aḩmadābād-e ʿAṭāyī; also known as Aḩmadābād) is a village in Hoseynabad Rural District, in the Central District of Anar County, Kerman Province, Iran. At the 2006 census, its population was 33, in 9 families.

References 

Populated places in Anar County